Santiago Ramírez may refer to:

 Santiago María Ramírez Ruíz de Dulanto (theologian) (1891-1967), Spanish Dominican friar
 Santiago Ramírez (baseball) (born 1978), Dominican baseball pitcher
 Santiago Ramírez (cyclist) (born 1994), Colombian track cyclist
 Santiago Ramírez (footballer, born 1998), Uruguayan football forward
 Santiago Ramírez (footballer, born 2001), Uruguayan football forward